Christoph Willibald Gluck (1714–1787) was a composer of Italian and French opera.
 
Gluck may also refer to:
 Gluck (surname)
 7624 Gluck, a main-belt asteroid
 Gluck (card game)
 Gluck (crater), a crater on Mercury
 Gluck (painter) (1895–1978), British painter (birth name Hannah Gluckstein)

See also
Glück (surname).